Josef Cesar (1814, Vienna - 29 June 1876, Vienna) was an Austrian sculptor and medallist.

Biography 

His parents originally meant for him to become a clergyman but, in 1829, at the age of fifteen, he obtained an apprenticeship with the engraving and artistic ironworking company, Wielthalm. Then, under the tutelage of Luigi  Pichler, studied the making of coinage and hardstone carving. He was there until 1842.

In 1845, he was able to visit the mints of Germany, France and England, at state expense. Three years later, he was named a member of the Academy in Vienna. Not long after, he started becoming discouraged by the amount of bureaucracy involved in the making of coins and medals, so he switched to producing large sculptures. From 1856, he taught modeling at two secondary schools. One of his best known students was the sculptor, Rudolf Weyr.

He also created fifteen portrait medallions of famous actors, in cement, for the box parapets at the Vienna State Opera.

References

Biography from Die Künstler aller Zeiten und Völker, Volume 4, by Adolf Seubert @ Google Books
 Biography in Meyers Konversations-Lexikon, 4th ed., vol.3, Verlag des Bibliographischen Instituts, Leipzig/Vienna 1885–1892, pg.907.

External links 

1814 births
1876 deaths
Austrian sculptors
Austrian medallists
Academy of Fine Arts Vienna alumni
Academic staff of the Academy of Fine Arts Vienna
Artists from Vienna